Armington is a village in Tazewell County, Illinois, United States. The population was 368 at the 2000 census. It is part of the Peoria, Illinois Metropolitan Statistical Area.

Geography
Armington is located at  (40.339078, -89.313741).

Demographics

As of the census of 2000, there were 368 people, 135 households, and 98 families residing in the village. The racial makeup of the village was 99.46% White, and 0.54% from two or more races. Hispanic or Latino of any race were 2.72% of the population.

There were 135 households, out of which 39.3% had children under the age of 18 living with them, 65.2% were married couples living together, 6.7% had a female householder with no husband present, and 26.7% were non-families. 25.2% of all households were made up of individuals, and 11.9% had someone living alone who was 65 years of age or older. The average household size was 2.73 and the average family size was 3.27.

In the village, the population was spread out, with 34.0% under the age of 18, 3.0% from 18 to 24, 33.4% from 25 to 44, 20.4% from 45 to 64, and 9.2% who were 65 years of age or older. The median age was 33 years. For every 100 females, there were 102.2 males. For every 100 females age 18 and over, there were 96.0 males.

The median income for a household in the village was $39,583, and the median income for a family was $47,708. Males had a median income of $39,306 versus $24,167 for females. The per capita income for the village was $17,866. About 3.1% of families and 8.0% of the population were below the poverty line, including 10.3% of those under age 18 and 5.3% of those age 65 or over.

References

Villages in Tazewell County, Illinois
Villages in Illinois
Peoria metropolitan area, Illinois